Kendal Williams (born September 23, 1995) is an American professional track and field athlete specializing in the sprints. Representing the United States at the 2014 World Junior Championships in Athletics, he earned gold medals in the 100 meters and the  relay, upsetting teammate and favorite Trayvon Bromell in the  who had earlier that year become the first junior to break the 10-second barrier.

Williams attended Stanton College Preparatory School where he won multiple state titles and was a high school All-American. He went to Florida State University on scholarship in 2014 and competed for the Seminoles in 2015, placing second in the Atlantic Coast Conference Championships  with a wind-assisted 9.98 seconds run as a freshman. However he transferred to the University of Georgia after his freshman year, following coach Ken Harnden whose contract had not been renewed by Florida State.

In his senior year at Georgia he clocked a  run, this time with allowable wind, in the Southeastern Conference Championships  to win and set a new personal best. He did not progress out of his heat at the NCAA Division I Championships, but he went on to make the final at the USA Championships, finishing third in his last race representing the Bulldogs.

Statistics
Information from World Athletics profile.

Personal bests

International championship results

National championship results

NCAA results from Track & Field Results Reporting System.

Seasonal bests

References

External links

Kendal Williams profile at Team USA
 (Georgia)
 (Florida State)
Kendal Williams bio at Georgia Bulldogs
Kendal Williams bio at Florida State Seminoles

1995 births
Living people
Sportspeople from Jacksonville, Florida
Track and field athletes from Florida
African-American male track and field athletes
American male sprinters
Florida State Seminoles men's track and field athletes
Georgia Bulldogs track and field athletes
Pan American Games gold medalists for the United States
Pan American Games medalists in athletics (track and field)
Athletes (track and field) at the 2015 Pan American Games
Medalists at the 2015 Pan American Games
21st-century African-American sportspeople